Caerau  may refer to:
 Caerau, Anglesey, a hamlet on Anglesey, north Wales
 Caerau, Bridgend, a village near Maesteg, south Wales
 Caerau F.C., Maesteg
 Caerau railway station
 Caerau (Bridgend electoral ward), an electoral ward in Maesteg, Wales
 Caerau, Cardiff, a district (and electoral ward) of the city of Cardiff, Wales